This is a list of the types of bombs.

For a list of individual nuclear weapons and models see List of nuclear weapons